Darcy Burchell is a Canadian ice hockey referee.

On September 1, 2011, Burchell was signed by the National Hockey League (NHL). He made his NHL debut on January 29, 2013, officiating a match-up between the Dallas Stars and Detroit Red Wings.

He was not re-hired by the NHL for the 2015-16 season, but continues to officiate in the American Hockey League.

References

External links
NHL Officials profile

Living people
Year of birth missing (living people)
National Hockey League officials
Place of birth missing (living people)